James, Jim, or Jimmy Murray may refer to:

Arts and entertainment
 James Murray (American actor) (1901–1936), American actor
 James Murray (director), director of films and programs such as The National Dream
 James Murray (English actor) (born 1975), English actor born in Manchester
 James Murray (puppeteer), see The Adventures of Timmy the Tooth
 James Murray (comedian) (born 1976), American comedian, television star and member of The Tenderloins
 James Murray (speed painter), British speed painter
 James Ramsey Murray (1841–1905), American composer of "Away in a Manger"
 Jim Murray (comics), British comics artist, see Sláine
 Jim Murray (musician) (1942–2013), San Francisco musician of the 1960s
 James Murray, half of photographer duo James and Karla Murray

Military
 James Murray (admiral), 16th-century Scottish shipbuilder in the Polish service, counter-admiral during the Battle of Oliwa
 James Wolfe Murray (1853–1919), British military officer and Chief of the Imperial General Staff in the 1910s
 James Murray (British Army officer, born 1721) (1721–1794), Scottish military officer and governor of Quebec
 James Murray of Strowan (1734–1794), Scottish general of the Seven Years' War and the American Revolution
 James Murray (VC) (1859–1942), Irish recipient of the Victoria Cross during the First Boer War
 James Pulteney (1755–1811), born James Murray, Scottish general and MP for Weycombe and Regis
 James Patrick Murray (British Army officer) (1782–1834), British soldier, MP for Yarmouth 1802–03
 James Lore Murray (1919–2004), USAF major general responsible for the ejection seat and the B-52 aircraft

Politics

United Kingdom 
 James Murray, Lord Philiphaugh (1655–1708), Scottish judge and politician
 Lord James Murray (1663–1719), MP for Perthshire
 James Murray, 2nd Duke of Atholl (1690–1764), Whig MP and lord of the Isle of Man, 1736–1764
 James Murray (Jacobite Earl of Dunbar) (1690–1770), Scottish Member of Parliament, later Jacobite Secretary of State
 James Murray (1727–1799), Scottish landowner, entrepreneur, and politician from Broughton and Cally, MP for Wigtownshire and Kirkcudbright
 James Murray (East Aberdeenshire MP) (1850–1933), Liberal Member of Parliament for Aberdeenshire Eastern
 James Murray, 1st Baron Glenlyon (1782–1837), British Army officer, member of parliament and peer
 James Murray (Durham politician) (1887–1965), Labour Party (UK) MP 1942–1955
 James Murray (London politician), English Labour Co-operative MP 2019–present

Others 
 James Murray (Ohio politician) (1830–1881), Attorney General of Ohio
 James Alexander Murray (1864–1960), premier of New Brunswick for a part of 1917
 James B. Murray (1920–2015), member of the Virginia House of Delegates
 James C. Murray (1917–1999), United States Representative from Illinois
 James E. Murray (1876–1961), United States Senator from Montana
 James Fitzgerald Murray (1805–1856), Australian politician
 James M. Murray (fl. 1990s–2020s), Designated Director of the U.S. Secret Service
 James Murray (Newfoundland politician) (1843–1900), Newfoundland politician
 James Murray (Australian politician) (1895–1974), Australian politician

Sports
 James Murray (boxer) (1969–1995), Scottish professional boxer who died from injuries sustained in a boxing fight
 James Murray (hurler) (born 1978), Irish hurler who plays with Waterford GAA
 Jamie Murray (born 1986), Scottish tennis player, specialist doubles player
 James Murray (luger) (born 1946), American Olympic luger
 Jimmy Murray (Gaelic footballer) (1917–2007), Roscommon All-Ireland winning Gaelic football captain of the 1940s
 Jim Murray (sportswriter) (1919–1998), American sportswriter, full name James Patrick Murray

Association football
 Jamie Murray (footballer) (born 1958), Scottish football fullback with Cambridge United and Brentford in the 1970s and 1980s
 Jimmy Murray (English footballer) (1935–2008), English football striker with Wolves, Manchester City and Walsall in the 1950s and 1960s
 Jimmy Murray (footballer, born 1880) (1880–1933), Scottish footballer who played in the early 20th century
 Jimmy Murray (footballer, born 1884) (1884–?), Northern Irish footballer
 Jimmy Murray (footballer, born 1933) (1933–2015), Scottish footballer who played for Heart of Midlothian and the Scotland national team

American football
 Jim Murray (American football), American football executive
 Jimmy Murray (American football) (born 1995), American football offensive lineman

Baseball
 Jim Murray (pitcher) (1894–1973), US baseball player for Brooklyn Robins
 Jim Murray (outfielder) (1878–1945), Major League Baseball outfielder, 1902–1914

Ice hockey
 Bearcat Murray (Jim Murray, born 1933), Canadian ice hockey trainer
 Jim Murray (ice hockey) (born 1943), Canadian ice hockey player

Science and medicine
 James Murray (biologist) (1865–?), Scottish biologist and explorer
 James Murray (lichenologist) (1923–1961), organic chemist and first modern lichenologist in New Zealand
 James Murray (physician) (1788–1871), Irish physician and creator of the medication known as milk of magnesia
 James A. Murray (zoologist) (fl. 1880s), zoologist and museum curator in Karachi
 James D. Murray (born 1931), mathematics professor

Religion
 James Murray (historian) (1732-1782), Church of Scotland minister, religious author and historian
 James Murray (bishop) (1828–1909), Roman Catholic bishop, the first Bishop of Maitland, New South Wales, Australia
 James Murray (Vicar Apostolic of Cooktown) (1847–1914), Roman Catholic bishop in Cooktown, Queensland, Australia
 James Albert Murray (1932–2020), American Roman Catholic bishop

Other fields
 James Murray (architect) (died 1634), Scottish architect
 James Murray (lexicographer) (1837–1915), Scottish lexicographer and editor of the Oxford English Dictionary
 James Murray, 2nd Earl of Annandale (died 1658), an Earl of Annandale
 Several Murray baronets, in the Baronetage of Nova Scotia
 James Murray (loyalist) (1713–1781), loyalist in North Carolina and Boston prior to the American Revolution
 James Boyles Murray (1789–1866), businessman in New York
 James Wolfe Murray, Lord Cringletie (1759–1836), Scottish lawyer 
 Jim Murray (trade unionist) (died 2007), British trade union leader
 Jim Murray (whisky writer) (born 1957), English whisky writer

See also
 James A. Murray (disambiguation)
 Murray (surname)